Chalonge may refer to:

People with the surname
 Christian de Chalonge (born 1937), French director and screenwriter
 Daniel Chalonge (1895–1977), French astronomer and astrophysicist

Other uses
 2040 Chalonge,  main-belt asteroid
 Chalonge (crater), a crater on the far side of the moon

French-language surnames